Anders Christian Golding (born 12 May 1984) is a Danish skeet shooter. He competed at the 2008 and 2012 Olympics and won a silver medal in 2012. This was Denmark's first medal at the 2012 Olympics and their first medal in the men's skeet since 1984. He finished behind American Vincent Hancock who took the gold medal for a second time. 
Golding is a carpenter by profession and lives in Oslo, Norway.

The medal scores in the 2012 Olympic final were Vincent Hancock 148/150, Anders Golding 146/150, and Nasser Al-Attiyah 144/150.

Golding was 25th in the qualification round at the 2008 Olympics.

References

External links 
 

1984 births
Living people
Sportspeople from Aarhus
Danish male sport shooters
Skeet shooters
Shooters at the 2008 Summer Olympics
Shooters at the 2012 Summer Olympics
Olympic shooters of Denmark
Olympic silver medalists for Denmark
Olympic medalists in shooting
Medalists at the 2012 Summer Olympics